The 2022 season was Tanjong Pagar United FC's 17th season at the top level of Singapore football. The club also competed in the Singapore Cup, going out in the group stage.

Squad

Singapore Premier League

U21 Squad

U17 Squad

Women Squad

Coaching staff

Transfers

In

Pre-season

Loan In

Loan Return

Out 
Pre-season

Mid-season

Loan Out 
Pre-season

Extension / Retained

Friendlies

Pre-season

In-season

Team statistics

Appearances and goals 

Numbers in parentheses denote appearances as substitute.

Competitions

Overview

Singapore Premier League

Singapore Cup

Group

Competition (U21)

Stage 1

 League table

Stage 2

 League table

Competition (U17)

U17 League

League table

Competition (WPL)

WPL League

See also 
 2020 Tanjong Pagar United FC season
 2021 Tanjong Pagar United FC season

Notes

References 

Tanjong Pagar United FC
Tanjong Pagar United FC
2022
1